Madhav Prasad Devkota is a Nepali writer. He was born in Palpa, Nepal.,

References

Year of birth missing (living people)
Living people
People from Palpa District
21st-century Nepalese male writers
Khas people